Hope & Faith is  an American sitcom that originally aired on ABC. It originally premiered on September 26, 2003 and ended on May 2, 2006, with a total of 73 episodes over the course of 3 seasons.

Series overview

Episodes

Season 1 (2003–04)

Season 2 (2004–05)

Season 3 (2005–06)

Lists of American sitcom episodes